Scrophularia umbrosa, the  green figwort, is a perennial herbaceous plant found in Europe and Asia. It grows in moist and cultivated waste ground.

The species looks very similar to the closely related Scrophularia auriculata (water figwort). Green figwort has a greener stem than water figwort, and lacks the leaf auricles which give water figwort its Latin name.

The plant is probably poisonous to cows. It is pollinated by bees and wasps. It can grow in semi-shade (light woodland) or no shade, but requires moist or wet soil.

Conservation

The global conservation status of this species, as of 2013, is least concern. In the United Kingdom it is a very locally distributed species though increasingly abundant.

Folklore
The plant was thought, by the doctrine of signatures to be able to cure the throat disease scrofula because of the throat-like shape of its flowers.

References

umbrosa
Medicinal plants
Flora of North America